"Better"  is a song recorded by American singer and songwriter Banks. It was released as single on November 4, 2015. The song was written by Banks, Peder Losnegård, and produced by the latter two.

Background
In the song, Banks portrays a woman who tries to convince her potential partner that she can love him better than his actual girlfriend, with the lines "I can love you better than she can". The singer said that the song is "like me unleashing a growl." Sydney Gore from Nylon commented, "even though she’s singing from a place of heartbreak, she makes it sound so seductive [...] it’s like being the witness of something tragic, but you can’t bring yourself to look away because there’s an unspoken element of beauty about it."

Music video
The music video for "Better" was directed by James Mountford. It was released on Banks's Vevo channel on November 4, 2015. The video features Banks dressed in gold foil and an unknown naked body arching up and down.

Charts

Release history

References

External links
 

2015 singles
2015 songs
Banks (singer) songs
Harvest Records singles
Songs written by Banks (singer)
Songs written by Lido (musician)